Jonathan Calderwood is a Northern Irish football groundskeeper who specialises in turf management of football pitches.

Career

In 2013, Calderwood was appointed groundskeeper of French Ligue 1 side PSG.

References

Expatriate sportspeople from Northern Ireland in France
Groundskeepers
Living people
Aston Villa F.C. non-playing staff
Paris Saint-Germain F.C. non-playing staff
Wolverhampton Wanderers F.C. non-playing staff